Samuel or Sam Martin may refer to:

 Samuel Martin (planter) (1694–1776), planter and politician in Antigua
 Samuel Martin (Secretary to the Treasury) (1714–1788), British politician and administrator
 Sir Samuel Martin (politician) (1801–1883), Anglo-Irish politician and judge
 Samuel Martin (writer) (1810–1848), New Zealand land claimant, magistrate, journalist and writer
 Samuel Martin (linguist) (1924–2009), linguist (Korean and Japanese) and designer of the Yale Romanization for Korean
 Samuel Martin (entrepreneur) (born 1984), British entrepreneur
 Samuel Soler Martín (born 1979), Paralympic swimmer from Spain
 Sam Martin (singer) (born 1983), American singer and songwriter
 Sam Martin (speedway rider) (born 1989), Australian speedway rider
 Sam Martin (American football) (born 1990), American football player